Parmacella tenerifensis is a species of air-breathing land slug, a shell-less terrestrial gastropod mollusk in the family Parmacellidae.

This slug is listed as endangered species in the IUCN Red List of Threatened Species, but it is listed as Vulnerable species in the Red Book of Invertebrates of Spain.

Description 
This species is brown in color.

Distribution
This species is endemic to the area east of San Cristóbal de La Laguna in Tenerife, Canary Islands.

Ecology 
This species inhabits ruderal biotopes.

References

Further reading 
 Alonso M. R., Ibáñez M., Valido M. J., Ponte-Lira C. E. & Henriquez F. C. (1991) (1988). "Catalogación de la malacofauna terrestre endémica de Canarias, con vistas a su protección. Isla de Tenerife". Iberus 8(2): 121-128.
 Diaz J. A., Alonso M. R. & Ibáñez M. (1986). "Los pulmonados desnudos de las Islas Canarias. I. Superfamilias Testacelloidea Gray 1840 y Zonitoidea Morch 1864". Vieraea 16: 81-96. La Laguna.

Endemic fauna of the Canary Islands
Molluscs of the Canary Islands
Parmacellidae
Gastropods described in 1985
Taxonomy articles created by Polbot
Taxobox binomials not recognized by IUCN